Harlin Glacier is a broad sweeping glacier that descends from the Antarctic polar plateau in the vicinity of Mount Nero on the northwest side of the Daniels Range, Victoria Land. It flows northeast between the Sample Nunataks and the north end of the Daniels Range and then eastward to join the lower part of Rennick Glacier. Lovejoy Glacier merges with the north side of this feature east of the Sample Nunataks but eventually loses its individual characteristics. The glacier was first mapped by the United States Geological Survey from surveys and U.S. Navy aerial photographs, 1960–62, and was named by the Advisory Committee on Antarctic Names for Ben W. Harlin, meteoroloist-in-charge at Little America V, 1957, and Scientific Leader at the Amundsen–Scott South Pole Station, 1961. This glacier lies situated on the Pennell Coast, a portion of Antarctica lying between Cape Williams and Cape Adare.

The Charybdis Icefalls are found in the lower portion of the glacier.

References

Glaciers of Pennell Coast